The Misses Stooge is a 1935 American comedy short released by Metro-Goldwyn-Mayer, produced by Hal Roach and directed by James Parrott, and starring Thelma Todd and Patsy Kelly. It is the 16th entry in the series.

Cast
Thelma Todd as Thelma
Patsy Kelly as Patsy
Esther Howard as the hostess
Herman Bing as Sazerac the Magician
Harry Bowen as Mr. Schmidt
Rafael Alcayde as The Duke of Gigolette
Henry Roquemore as Pinsky

References

External links 
 The Misses Stooge at the Internet Movie Database

American comedy films
1935 comedy films
1935 short films
1930s American films